is the third single of the J-pop idol group Morning Musume, released on September 9, 1998 as an 8 cm CD. It sold a total of 410,850 copies. In 2004 it was re-released as part of the Early Single Box and again in 2005 as a 12 cm CD. Lead vocals of this single were Natsumi Abe and Asuka Fukuda. It was Morning Musume's first single to reach the #1 position on the Oricon music charts.

Track listing 
All songs written by Tsunku.

8 cm CD 
  – 4:26
  – 4:07
 Daite Hold on Me! (Instrumental) – 4:22

12 cm CD (Early Single Box and individual release) 
 
 
 Daite Hold on Me! (Instrumental)

Members at time of single 
1st generation: Yuko Nakazawa, Aya Ishiguro, Kaori Iida, Natsumi Abe, Asuka Fukuda
2nd generation: Kei Yasuda, Mari Yaguchi, Sayaka Ichii

Cover versions
 You Kikkawa covered the song on her 2012 cover album Vocalist?.

External links 
 Daite Hold on Me! entry on the Up-Front Works website

Morning Musume songs
Zetima Records singles
1998 singles
Oricon Weekly number-one singles
Songs written by Tsunku
Japanese-language songs
1998 songs
Song recordings produced by Tsunku